Altitude record may refer to:

Flight altitude record, the highest altitude to have been reached in an aircraft
World altitude record (mountaineering), the highest altitude to have been reached by mountaineers